Nicolas Onuțu (born 27 December 1995) is a Romanian rugby union player. He played as a wing for professional SuperLiga club CSM București.

Club career
Nicolas Onuțu started playing rugby as a youth for French club Valence Sportif. In 2015 he was signed by Fédérale 1 club ROC La Voulte-Valence playing the for a year. In 2016 followed a move to SC Royannais and in 2017 he moved to Fédérale 2 club CS Vienne. In 2018 he was signed by Romanian SuperLiga side, CSM București.

International career
Onuțu is also selected for Romania's national team, the Oaks, making his international debut at the 2016 World Rugby Nations Cup in a match against the Welwitschias.

References

External links

1995 births
Living people
Romanian rugby union players
Romania international rugby union players
French people of Romanian descent
CSM București (rugby union) players
Rugby union wings